A coliphage is a type of bacteriophage that infects coliform bacteria such as Escherichia coli. Coliphage originate almost exclusively from human feces and from other warm-blooded animals. They undergo limited replication in sewage and contaminated waters under specific conditions, such as a high density of susceptible hosts at optimal temperatures.

Examples include Enterobacteria phage λ and species from the family Fersviridae. Coliphage levels reflect the persistence of pathogenic viruses in the environment and have been proposed as an indicator of fecal contamination in water.

References

External links 
 
A science project targeted towards students showing an example of the use of Coliphages

Bacteriophages